Star Academy is a reality TV show created by Endemol.

Star Academy may also refer to:

Or its versions under the name Star Academy: 
Star Académie, Quebec, Canada
Star Academy Arab World, pan-Arab (based in Lebanon)
Star Academy (Bulgarian TV series)
Star Academy (Georgian TV series)
Star Academy (French TV series)
Star Academy (Greek TV series)

Or its versions under other names:
Fame Academy, United Kingdom
Comic Relief Does Fame Academy, United Kingdom
Fame Gurukul, India
Fame Story, Greece
Operacija trijumf, ex-Yugoslavia (Croatia, Serbia, Bosnia & Herzegovina, Macedonia and Montenegro)
Operación Triunfo (Argentine TV series)
Operación Triunfo (Mexican TV series)
Operación Triunfo (Spanish TV series)
Pinoy Dream Academy, Philippines
Project Fame, pan-African
Star Factory, Russia
The One: Making a Music Star, United States

Other
STAR Academy (novel), a 2009 novel by Edward Kay

See also
North Star Academy (disambiguation)